Farlowella vittata is a species of armored catfish native to the Orinoco River basin of Colombia and Venezuela.  This species grows to a length of  SL.

Breeding

The female lays the eggs on a surface during the night and the male fertilizes them. The male then stays near the eggs to protect them from predators to and ensure fungus does not grow on the eggs. By day 3 the fry can be seen moving within the eggs and by day 5 the fry are clearly visible as fish.

By day 6 the eggs start to hatch and all have hatched by day 9. The fry are very small, and because this catfish is a limnovore, in an aquarium the fry need a well planted set up in order to get the amount of algae needed for survival and growth.

References 

vittata
Freshwater fish of Colombia
Fish of Venezuela
Fish described in 1942